Kerry Hooper (9 June 1942 – 16 March 2017) was an Australian cricketer. He played three first-class matches for Tasmania between 1965 and 1973.

See also
 List of Tasmanian representative cricketers

References

External links
 

1942 births
2017 deaths
Australian cricketers
Tasmania cricketers
Cricketers from Launceston, Tasmania